Vennello Aadapilla (English: Lady in the moonlight) is a novel written by Yandamoori Veerendranath published by Nava Sahithi and written in the author's native Telugu language. The novel has been adapted into a TV series, which received the Nandi Award for Best Director.

Vennello Aadapilla revolves around a world class chess player and a telephone conversation with an operator. The story begins with the young chess player, Revanth, winning the World Chess Championships in Russia. One day he gets a call from an unknown female fan who wanted to congratulate him for his win. During the conversation the girl challenges him to identify her name and address, and thus sets Revanth on a mission to locate the mysterious girl. 

The novel contains several puzzles and riddles to keep the reader in suspense, and explores the themes of dedication and determination shown through the protagonist Raventh.

Adaptations
The novel was adapted as a television series of same name which was aired on DD Saptagiri in the 1990s. The novel was also adapted into the films Hello I Love You (Telugu) and Beladingala Baale (Kannada).

References

Indian romance novels
Telugu novels
Indian novels adapted into television shows
Indian novels adapted into films